Wusu Sannoh is a Sierra Leonean politician. He is the mayor of Bo City Council and member of the Sierra Leone People's Party (SLPP).

References

Living people
Year of birth missing (living people)
People from Bo, Sierra Leone
Sierra Leone People's Party politicians
Mayors of places in Sierra Leone
Place of birth missing (living people)
21st-century Sierra Leonean politicians